Düsseldorfer Marionetten-Theater  is a marionette theatre in Düsseldorf, North Rhine-Westphalia, Germany.

Theatres in Düsseldorf